Euproctis limbalis, the bordered browntail moth, is a moth of the subfamily Lymantriinae first described by Gottlieb August Wilhelm Herrich-Schäffer in 1855. It is known from Australia, including Queensland and New South Wales.

The wingspan is about 40 mm. Adults have a dark brown body and brown wings. The wings have a band of white along the edges.

Hairs on the caterpillar and cocoon may can cause mild to severe skin irritations.

The caterpillars have been recorded as pests feeding on leaves and earheads of sorghum and other millets.

References

Lymantriinae
Insect pests of millets